The Airborne XT is an Australian series of two-seat flying wing ultralight trikes designed and produced by Airborne Windsports and introduced in 2003.

Design and development
The XT series features an XT carriage and a cable-braced hang glider-style high-wing, weight-shift controls, a two-seats-in-tandem open cockpit, tricycle landing gear and a single engine in pusher configuration.

The wing is made from bolted-together aluminium tubing, with its double surface wing covered in Dacron sailcloth. Its  span wing is supported by a single tube-type kingpost and uses an "A" frame control bar. A number of different wings are available for the series. The XT was the first carriage used by Airborne that incorporated landing gear shock absorbers. It also uses a gas strut to lower and raise the wing for rigging it. Powerplants include the  Rotax 912 four cylinder, four stroke, horizontally-opposed aircraft engine and the  Rotax 582 twin cylinder, two stroke, inline engine.

Variants
XT-912 Streak 2
Initial version with  Rotax 912 engine, Streak 2 wing and cockpit fairing, introduced in 2003.
XT912-SST Tundra
Model with  Rotax 912 engine and SST strut-braced wing, cockpit fairing and tundra tires for off-airport operations.
XT-912 Tundra
Model with  Rotax 912 engine and Streak or Cruze model wing, cockpit fairing and tundra tires for off-airport operations.
XT-912 Tourer
Model with  Rotax 912 engine and Streak or Cruze model wing and cockpit fairing.
XT-912 Outback
Development of the Airborne Outback model with  Rotax 912 engine tundra wheels,  fuel tank and GX instrument package and no cockpit fairing.
XT-582 Tourer
Model with  Rotax 582 engine, Cruze model wing and cockpit fairing.
XT-582 Tundra
Model with  Rotax 582 engine, tundra tires and cockpit fairing.
XT-582 Outback
Development of the Airborne Outback model with  Rotax 582 engine, tundra tires and no fairing.

Specifications (XT Streak 2)

References

External links

2000s Australian ultralight aircraft
Single-engined pusher aircraft
Ultralight trikes